Porokhovo is a rural locality (a village) in Vysokovskoye Rural Settlement, Ust-Kubinsky District, Vologda Oblast, Russia. The population was 274 as of 2002. There are 5 streets.

Geography 
Porokhovo is located 8 km northeast of Ustye (the district's administrative centre) by road. Plyushchevo is the nearest rural locality.

References 

Rural localities in Tarnogsky District